Sailor Moon S: The Movie is a 1994 Japanese animated superhero fantasy film directed by Hiroki Shibata and written by Sukehiro Tomita. It is the second film in the series, following Sailor Moon R: The Movie (1993), and is loosely adapted from a side story of the original Sailor Moon manga series created by Naoko Takeuchi, The Lover of Princess Kaguya. It takes its name from the third arc of the Sailor Moon anime series, Sailor Moon S, as Toei Company distributed it around the same time. The film was released in Japan on December 4, 1994, as part of the Winter '94 Toei Anime Fair.

Plot
An extraterrestrial ice entity named  arrives on Earth in an attempt to freeze it, but a fragment of her comet has been lost and she is unable to proceed without it. She has her henchwomen, the Snow Dancers, search for the missing fragment. In Tokyo, a young astronomer named  finds the fragment and keeps it in his observatory to study it further.

Meanwhile, the Sailor Guardians are enjoying a day in the Juban Shopping District. Luna falls ill and decides to go back to Usagi's house. Along the way, she collapses while crossing the road, and is almost hit by a car, but is rescued and nursed to health by Kakeru. Luna then develops romantic feelings for him, even kissing him on the cheek in his sleep, leaving Artemis crushed. Luna herself ends up with unrequited love because it is revealed that Kakeru himself has a girlfriend, an astronaut named , and more importantly, because Luna is a cat. The two are devastated because Himeko is oblivious to Kakeru's belief of Princess Kaguya's existence. Later, after finding herself unable to reconcile her differences with Kakeru, Himeko leaves on a space mission.

The fragment of the comet attaches itself to his life force, and begins slowly stealing his life-force energy, causing him to become very ill. Kaguya later steals the shard, but because it is linked to his life-force, he is brought even closer to death when Kaguya throws the shard into the ocean and creates an enormous ice crystal that will continue to drain away Kakeru's life-force energy completely. She and her Snow Dancers then begin freezing the entire Earth, little by little. The Sailor Guardians attempt to stop her, only for Kaguya to revive the Snow Dancers using the Crystal. Just before Kaguya could kill the Sailor Scouts, Sailor Moon arrives and tries to talk her out of her plot. Wanting more strength, she activates the mighty powers of the legendary Holy Grail to evolve into Super Sailor Moon, but is easily overpowered by Snow Queen Kaguya. Determined to protect the Earth and its people, Usagi prepares to activate the Legendary Silver Crystal's immense energy and power. The eight Sailor Guardians, along with Sailor Chibi Moon, combine their own strength and Sailor abilities at once to further strengthen the healing power of the Legendary Silver Crystal, destroying Snow Queen Kaguya and the Snow Dancers head-on, and eliminating the ice crystal in the ocean, as well as her comet.

Usagi wishes for Luna to become the mythical Princess Kaguya for one night. Concerned about Himeko's safety, Kakeru wanders in the snowstorm and is saved by Luna at the exact point Kakeru saved her, transformed into a human. She takes him near the moon, where Himeko, on her space mission, witnesses the phenomenon and realizes that Princess Kaguya does exist. Luna tells him that he needs to start focusing on his relationship with Himeko, and the two kiss. After returning to the Earth, Kakeru takes up Luna's advice and meets Himeko at the airport, where the two lovingly hug. Artemis meets up with Luna, and the cats reconcile.

Voice cast

Production
Sailor Moon S: The Movie is based on the 135-page side story , written and illustrated by series creator Naoko Takeuchi and later published by Kodansha. Dissatisfied that she had left the production of the previous film to others, Takeuchi envisioned "Princess Kaguya's Lover" as the plot of Sailor Moon S: The Movie, and proceeded to write the story "all in one go." She modeled the antagonist after an Art Deco antique named "Salome", while the Snow Dancers are modeled after a German china piece, which Takeuchi thought resembled "a character dancing in a snowstorm." On July 8, 1994, she traveled to the Kennedy Space Center in Florida as part of her research; there, she watched the launch of space shuttle Columbia. She enjoyed working on the film, and liked the overall result, particularly Luna's transformation sequence. The film was soft matted for its theatrical release, as it was animated in 4:3 aspect ratio.

The film was directed by Sailor Moon episode director Hiroki Shibata, while Sailor Moon episode animation director and key animator Hisashi Kagawa took the role of the character design and animation director. Sukehiro Tomita returned from the previous film and wrote the script for this film.

Release

Japanese release
The film was released in Japanese theaters on December 4, 1994.

The Japanese Blu-ray collection of the three films was released on February 7, 2018, with this film titled Pretty Guardian Sailor Moon S: The Movie.

English releases
The film was first released in North America on VHS by Pioneer Entertainment on August 31, 1999, in Japanese with English subtitles. Pioneer later released the film to uncut bilingual DVD on May 23, 2000, alongside another VHS release containing an edited version of the English dub. Pioneer re-released their DVD on January 6, 2004 under their "Geneon Signature Series" line. The DVDs later fell out of print when Pioneer/Geneon lost the license to the film. The edited version was also shown on TV in Canada on YTV and in the US on Cartoon Network's Toonami block on November 9, 2001.

The English dub was produced in association with Optimum Productions in Toronto, Canada, and featured most of the original DIC Entertainment English cast reprising their roles. The edited version of the dub was censored for content and replaced the music with cues from the DIC version of the first two seasons of the anime. The uncut version of the dub was only seen on the bilingual DVD, featured no censorship, and all of the original Japanese music was left intact, with the exception of the DIC theme song being used.

In 2014, the film was re-licensed for an updated English-language release in North America by Viz Media, who have produced a new English dub of the film in association with Los Angeles-based Studiopolis and re-released it on DVD and Blu-ray on October 2, 2018. The film was released to North American theaters with one-day screenings nationwide as a double feature with Sailor Moon R: The Movie, in association with Fathom Events. Dubbed screenings were on July 28, 2018, and subtitled screenings on July 30, 2018. It has also been licensed in Australia and New Zealand by Madman Entertainment.

Reception

See also
 The Snow Queen

Notes

References

External links
 
 

1994 anime films
1990s animated superhero films
1990s Japanese superhero films
1990s teen fantasy films
Animated films about cats
Anime and manga based on fairy tales
Films about astronauts
Films based on The Snow Queen
Films scored by Takanori Arisawa
Kaguya-hime
Sailor Moon films